= La Silsa =

Neighbourhood in Caracas, Venezuela

La Silsa is a neighborhood in Caracas, Venezuela.

The neighborhood is considered to be a slum with a high crime rate.
